Rabindra Nritya Natya is the group of four dance-dramas composed by Bengal's Nobel laureate Rabindranath Tagore: Chitrangada, Chandalika, Shyama and Shrabangatha. The principal characteristic of these works is that the story is told entirely through dance and song. The dances included in them were in the dance form created by Tagore. Tagore also included dance in earlier works such as Tasher Desh, though these are not regarded as Rabindra Nritya Natya.

See also
 Santiniketan

References

http://www.tagoreweb.in/Render/ShowContentType.aspx?ct=Plays
http://www.geetabitan.com/

Bengali culture
Memorials to Rabindranath Tagore